United Nations Security Council Resolution 200 was adopted unanimously on March 15, 1965. After examining the application of the Gambia for membership in the United Nations, the Council recommended to the General Assembly that the Gambia be admitted.

See also
List of United Nations Security Council Resolutions 101 to 200 (1953–1965)
List of United Nations Security Council Resolutions 201 to 300 (1965–1971)

References
Text of the Resolution at undocs.org

External links
 

 0200
1965 in the Gambia
 0200
 0200
March 1965 events